"Cannonball" is a song by Belgian singer-songwriter Tom Dice. The song was released as a digital download in Belgium on 20 October 2017 through Universal Music Belgium as the lead single from his forth studio album Better Days (2018).

Track listing

Chart performance

Weekly charts

Release history

References

Tom Dice songs
2017 singles
2017 songs
Songs written by Tom Dice